Daniel Mace may refer to:

 Daniel Mace (politician) (1811–1867), U.S. Representative from Indiana
 Daniel Mace (biblical scholar) (died c. 1753), English textual critic of the New Testament